Segler is a surname of German origin. Notable people with the surname include:

Burkhard Segler (born 1951), German footballer
Olga Segler (1881–1961), German octogenarian woman who died while attempting to cross the Berlin Wall

Surnames of German origin